The Pig, or Václav Havel's Hunt for a Pig is the final work by Václav Havel, co-authored by Vladimír Morávek.  The English translation is by Edward Einhorn .  Originally a short dialogue from 1987 (entitled simply The Pig) and printed in a samizdat, the piece is a comic (and true) story of Václav Havel’s efforts to hold a pig roast for his friends.

In 2010, Morávek rediscovered the dialogue and decided to stage it. He began by giving lines to characters only mentioned in passing, but then made a more radical choice: he added sections from one of the most beloved Czech works, The Bartered Bride. This new version was the centerpiece of a theater festival in Brno that June.

The English translation was performed at the 3LD Art & Technology Center in New York as part of the Ohio Theater's Ice Factory   It was later published by Theater 61 Press.  It was remounted in 2014 at 3LD Art + Technology Center.

The cast and production team of this play consisted of the following:

PRODUCTION TEAM
 Director - Henry Akona
 Choreographer - Patrice Miller
 Stage Manager - Elizabeth Irwin
 Assistant Musical Director - Melissa Elledge
 Assistant Director - Joe Pilowski
 Dramaturg - Karen Lee Ott
 Set Designer - Jane Stein
 Lighting Designer - Jeff Nash
 Costume Designer - Carla Gant
 Projection Designers - Kate Freer & David Tennet
 Sound Operator - Will Campbell
 Band Coordinator - Yvonne Roen

CAST
 American Journalist - Katherine Boynton
 Accordion - Melissa Elledge
 Ensemble - Elizabeth Figols-Galagarza
 Kešot/Ensemble - John Gallop III
 Camera Op - Andrew Goldsmith
 Havel - Robert Honeywell
 Fanda/Choral Leader/Trombone - Michael Hopewell
 Violin - Amanda Lo
 Cello - Michael Midlarsky
 Tap Master's Wife/Ensemble/Clarinet - Jenny Lee Mitchell
 Grip - Mateo Moreno
 Tomačka/Ensemble/Violin - Phoebe Silva
 Soprano Soloist/Ensemble - Moira Stone
 Tenor Soloist/Ensemble - Terrence Stone
 Tap Master/Ensemble - Michael Whitney
 Olga/Ensemble/Flute - Sandy York

External links
The Pig, or Václav Havel's Hunt for a Pig | Translator's Note Theater 61 Press website

References

Plays by Václav Havel
1987 plays
2010 plays